Windows spotlight is a feature included with Windows 10 and Windows 11 which downloads images and advertisements from Bing and displays them as background wallpapers on the lock screen. In 2017, Microsoft began adding location information for many of the photographs.

Technical Details 
Windows spotlight images are provided by Windows' Content Delivery Manager. New ones are shown every 1–2 days. Once downloaded; spotlight images are stored on the computer. If the Content Delivery Manager has no new picture to display, a default image is used. This default fallback image can be changed.

Photo locations 
Photo location information is made available to the computer user. The images typically depict identifiable, well-known locations such as famous historical or natural landmarks and rarely show any human beings. Location information is occasionally provided, while photo credits are typically not. The following subjects have been featured (alphabetical by continent):

Africa 
 Abu Simbel, Egypt
 The White Desert (Sahara el Beyda) near Farafra, Egypt 
 Nile River near Luxor, Egypt
 Sway bridge at The Palace of the Lost City, Sun City, South Africa
 Grand Anse Beach, La Digue Island, Seychelles
 Isalo National Park, Madagascar
 Sahara Desert dunes near Ouargla, Algeria
 Waterfalls near Chamarel, Mauritius

Antarctica 
 Lemaire Channel

Asia 
 Angkor Wat, Cambodia
 Longsheng Rice Terrace, China
 Chateau Laffitte Hotel, Beijing, China
 Canola fields in Luoping County, China
 Dushanzi Grand Canyon, Dushanzi District, Karamay, China
 Huangshang Mountains, China
 Yangshuo County, China
 Zhangjiajie National Forest Park, China
 Zhangye Danxia National Geological Park, China
 Hong Kong skyline, Hong Kong
 Jal Mahal, Jaipur, India
 Taj Mahal, Agra, India
 Kelimutu, Indonesia
 Lampung, Indonesia
 Azadi Tower, Tehran, Iran
 Vakil Mosque, Shiraz, Iran
 Hokkaido Island, Japan
 Yamanashi Prefecture, Japan
 A lagoon in Semporna, Malaysia, Borneo
 El Nido, Philippines
 Quiapo, Philippines
 Lake Baikal, Siberia, Russia
 Rub' al Khali, Saudi Arabia
 Supertree Grove, Gardens by the Bay, Singapore
 Bukhansan National Park, South Korea
 Hehuanshan Mountain, Taiwan
 Ko Tapu off Khao Phing Kan, Phang Nga Bay, Thailand
 Ko Phayam, Andaman Sea, Thailand
 Sam Pan Bok, Ubon Ratchathani, Thailand
 Ao Ta Lo Woo pier in Ko Tarutao, Tarutao National Park , Thailand
 Ha Long Bay, Vietnam

Europe 
 Garni Gorge, Armenia
 Hallstatt, Austria
 Lake Gosau, Austria
 Central Train Station, Antwerp, Belgium
 Bruges, Belgium
 Devetashka Cave, Lovech Province, Bulgaria
 Rab Island coastline, Croatia
 Land's End, Cornwall, England
 Palace of Westminster London, England
 Port Isaac, England
 Stonehenge, England 
 Wastwater Lake, Lake District, England
 Yorkshire, England
 Lac du Pontet, Villar-d'Arêne, France
 Luberon, Gordes, France
 Arles, France (ISS Photo)
 Arc de Triomphe, Paris, France
 Réunion, France
 Nuuk, Greenland
 Tasermiut Fjord, Greenland
 Arch bridge Rakotzbrucke or Devil's bridge in Kromlau, Germany
 The Baltic Sea in Mecklenburg-Vorpommern, Germany
 Eibsee Lake in Bavaria, Germany
 Überseequartier station in Hamburg, Germany 
 Hohenzollern Castle, Baden-Württemberg, Germany
 Lüneburg Heath, Germany
 Diving bell at Zingst Pier, Zinnowitz, Germany
 Saxon Switzerland National Park, Germany
 Andros, Greece
 Mykonos, Greece
 Navagio, Greece
 Oia, Greece
 Fisherman's Bastion, Budapest, Hungary
 Lake Balaton, Hungary
 Seljalandsfoss, Iceland
 Jökulsárlón, Iceland
 Lakagígar, Iceland
 Burano, Italy
 Colza fields in Tuscany, Italy
 Civita di Bagnoregio in the Province of Viterbo, Italy
 Antorno Lake w/Lavaredo Peaks in the Dolomites, Italy
 Leaning Tower of Pisa, Pisa, Italy 
 Palazzo Vecchio, Florence, Italy
 Seiser Alm meadow in the Dolomites, Italy
 Sunrise in Tuscany, Italy
 Selva di Val Gardena, South Tyrol, Italy
 Giant's Causeway, Northern Ireland
 Lofoten Islands, Norway
 Grøtfjord, Troms County, Norway
 Hotel Durmitor, Durmitor National Park, Montenegro
 Lake Biograd, Biogradska Gora National park, Montenegro
 Doesburg, Netherlands
 Morskie Oko lake, Tatra National Park, Poland
 The Algarve coast, Portugal
 Elektrozavodskaya station, Moscow, Russia
 Neist Point, Isle of Skye, Scotland
 Trotternish, Isle of Skye, Scotland
 Victoria Street and West Bow, Edinburgh, Scotland
 Lake Bled, Slovenia
 Delika Canyon waterfall, Nervion River, Spain
 Ronda, Spain
 Nervión River Falls, Basque Country, Spain
 San Juan de Gaztelugatxe, Bermeo, Spain
 Archipelago of Gothenburg, Sweden
 Newcastle Upon Tyne, England

North America 
 Kananaskis Country, Alberta, Canada
 Moraine Lake, Alberta, Canada
 Lake Louise, Alberta, Canada
 Banff National Park, Alberta, Canada
 Vancouver from Burnaby Mountain, BC, Canada
 Numa Falls, British Columbia, Canada
 Landing Lake in Manitoba, Canada
 Peggy's Cove Lighthouse, Nova Scotia, Canada
 Niagara Falls, Ontario, Canada and New York, US
 Tobermory, Ontario, Canada
 Perce Rock Quebec, Canada
 Havana, Cuba
 Punta Gorda, Florida
 Antigua Guatemala, Guatemala 
 Lake Atitlan Guatemala
 Durango, Mexico 
 Tamul and Tamasopo waterfalls, Aquismón, near the Cave of Swallows, Huasteca Potosina, Mexico
 Philipsburg, Sint Maarten
 Antelope Canyon, Arizona, US
 Cathedral Rock, Arizona, US
 The Wave, Vermillion Cliffs National Monument, Arizona, US
 Badwater Basin, Death Valley, California, US
 Golden Gate Bridge, California, US
 Convict Lake, California, US
 Natural Bridges State Beach, Santa Cruz, California, US
 Yosemite National Park, California, US
 Zabriske Point, Death Valley, California, US
 Bixby Creek Bridge, Big Sur Coast, California, US
 Griffith Observatory and Los Angeles, California, US
 South Dakota Highway 87 Needle Eye natural granite tunnel, South Dakota, US
 Brasstown Bald, Georgia, US
 Kailua Pier, Hawaii, Hawaii, US
 Na Pali Coast, Kauai, Hawaii, US
 Oahu, Hawaii, Hawaii, US
 Chicago Lakefront, Illinois, US
 Acadia National Park, Maine, US
 St Joseph Lighthouse, Michigan, US
 Gateway Arch, St. Louis, Missouri, US
 Grinnell Point on Swiftcurrent Lake, Glacier National Park, Montana, US
 Bisti/De-Na-Zin Wilderness, New Mexico, US
 Valley of Fire State Park, Nevada, US
 Bethesda Terrace and Fountain, Central Park, New York City, New York, US
 Castilleja Indivisa wild flowers field, Oklahoma, US
 Vista House, Columbia River Gorge, Oregon, US
 Mesa Arch, Canyonlands National Park, Utah, US
 Teton Range, Wyoming, US
 Grand Prismatic Spring, Yellowstone National Park, Wyoming, US
 Pennybacker Bridge, Austin, Texas, US
 Bryce Canyon National park, Utah, US
 Silver Falls State Park, Oregon, US

Central America 
 Tenorio Volcano National Park waterfall place, Costa Rica
 Tikal, Guatemala

South America 
 Esquel, Argentina
 Iguazu Falls, Argentina and Brazil
 Laguna de Los Tres and Mount Fitz Roy in Patagonia, Argentina
 Rio de Janeiro from Sugarloaf Mountain, Brazil
 Copacabana and Ipanema beaches in Rio de Janeiro , Brazil
 Torres del Paine National Park, Chile
 Caño Cristales River, Colombia
 Bartolome Island Galapagos Islands, Ecuador
 Los Roques archipelago, Venezuela
 Mount Roraima (surrounding Venezuela, Brazil and Guyana)
 Tayrona National Natural Park, Colombia
 Laguna Garzón Bridge, Uruguay

Oceania 
 The Twelve Apostles, Victoria, Australia
 Kiama Harbour, NSW, Australia
 Gordon Dam, Tasmania, Australia
 Uluru, Northern Territory, Australia
 Moorea, French Polynesia
 Milford Sound, New Zealand
 Moeraki Boulders, New Zealand
 Browns Island, New Zealand
 Lake Wanaka, New Zealand
 Aupouri Peninsula, New Zealand
 Lake Quill, New Zealand
 Taranaki volcano seen from the Mangamahoe lake, New Zealand

Other pictures 
 Red deer in Richmond Park, London
 Fauna in Madagascar
 Catamaran on the beach in Madagascar
 Butterflies in Kaeng Krachan National Park, Thailand
 Male black-naped monarch (bird)
 Blue-footed Booby, Galapagos Islands
 European hedgehog
 Greylag goose landing on lake
 Sea Otter Homer, Alaska
 Two egrets dancing in a lake, by Tahir Abbas from Pakistan
 Golden butterflyfish swimming with sea goldies near Red Sea, Egypt
 Rothschild's giraffe and pelicans, near Lake Nakuru, Kenya
 Witch's Broom Nebula, outerspace

Advertisements 
 Advertisement of the music service Shazam
 Advertisement of Groove Music pass
 Advertisement of Microsoft Movies & TV
 Advertisement of Microsoft Outlook
 Advertisement of Microsoft Rewards
 Advertisement of Mixer (website)

References

External links 

Computer-related introductions in 2015
Windows 10
Windows NT